DXNL-TV, channel 27, is a television station of Siam Broadcasting Corporation and affiliate of People's Television Network. Its head offices, studios, transmitters and broadcast facilities are located at Kauswagan, Cagayan de Oro and at Executive Centrum building J. R. Borja Street, Cagayan de Oro. Currently the station is inactive.

History
PTV Cagayan de Oro begin its broadcasts on Channel 8 (DXHB-TV) as the affiliate of Government Television (GTV) through National Media Production Center and later renamed Maharlika Broadcasting System (MBS) in 1980. In 1986, after the People Power Revolution, MBS was renamed People's Television (PTV) followed by frequency from Channel 8 to Channel 7 with the call sign DXBS-TV. On March 26, 1992, by virtue of Republic Act 7306, PTV became People's Television Network, Inc. (PTNI).

Then in 1995, DXNL-TV Channel 27 was launched by GMA Network through Citynet Television which was turned into a music channel, Channel V Philippines from 1999 to 2001. In 2001, the station was launched by National Broadcasting Network (NBN) and adopted mostly programs that showcase the programs of the Arroyo administration. On October 6, 2011, NBN was renamed back as People's Television Network (PTV), eventually, after fifteen years of broadcasting of the original Channel 7. In 2018, after it was lasted for seventeen years in Cagayan de Oro, the station is currently off the air.

Television stations in Cagayan de Oro
People's Television Network stations
Television channels and stations established in 1995